Evenflo is a 100 year old infant feeding brand. Evenflo Feeding, Inc. is headquartered in West Chester, Ohio and has had a presence in Ohio since being founded in 1920 as the Pyramid Rubber Company. Evenflo Feeding manufactures breast pumps, baby bottles, pacifiers and sippy cups.

Headquartered in Boston, Massachusetts, Evenflo Company, Inc. operates the juvenile travel and home safety businesses with products that include car seats, travel systems, safety gates, high chairs, play yards, stationary activity centers, infant carriers and doorway jumpers. Evenflo Company Inc. has two manufacturing facilities: one in Piqua, Ohio, and one in Tijuana, Mexico.

History
The Evenflo brand traces its roots back to the 1920 founding of the Pyramid Rubber Company in Ravenna, Ohio.  Initially, the company was a manufacturer of products related to baby feeding.  In 1995, Evenflo Company, Inc. was created through the merger of Evenflo Juvenile Products and Evenflo Juvenile Furniture Company (formerly known as Questor Juvenile Furniture Company).

The company was acquired by private equity firm Kohlberg Kravis Roberts & Co., together with Spalding in 1996 and again in 1997 by Gerry Baby Products Company, a division of Huffy Corporation.  In 2004, Harvest Partners another private equity firm, acquired the company. Harvest sold Evenflo to Weston Presidio in 2007.

In January 2012, Evenflo Company Inc. sold their feeding business to Kimberly-Clark de México, a personal and family care products company in Mexico. From then on, Evenflo-branded products began to be marketed under the names “Evenflo Baby”, and “Evenflo Feeding” respectively. Nearly a year later, in November 2012, Evenflo Company, Inc. sold their Ameda® breastfeeding business to Platinum Products Holding, Inc. (a portfolio company of Crimson Investment).

Evenflo Company, Inc. was officially acquired by Goodbaby International Holdings Limited in July 2014. Goodbaby International is a durable juvenile products company that is listed on the Main Board of the Hong Kong Stock Exchange (1086:HK). The Group designs, researches and develops, manufactures, markets and sells strollers, children's car seats, cribs, bicycles and tricycles and other durable juvenile products.

Products
Evenflo's core products include breast pumps, baby bottles, pacifiers, sippy cups, car seats, strollers, portable play yards, and stationary activity centers.

Booster seat controversy
A 2020 investigation by ProPublica showed that Evenflo sold child car seats that the company's engineers raised safety concerns about, and that the company misleadingly advertised those car seats as "SIDE IMPACT TESTED" when those tests had shown that the seats posed a grave danger to the child in case of a crash.

In February 2020, ProPublica, a not-for-profit that produces investigative journalism, claimed that the company ignored safety engineer Eric Dahle's recommendation to stop selling booster seats for children who weighed less than 40 pounds.

References

Infant products companies
Babycare
Infancy
Private equity portfolio companies
Manufacturing companies established in 1920
Companies based in Dayton, Ohio
1920 establishments in Ohio